Madagascar competed in the 2003 All-Africa Games held at the National Stadium in the city of Abuja, Nigeria.

Medal summary
Madagascar won six medals, three gold and three bronze.

Medal table

List of Medalists

Gold Medal

Bronze Medal

References

2003 in Malagasy sport
2003
 Nations at the 2003 All-Africa Games